Linux.com is a website owned by the Linux Foundation. The goal of the site is to provide information about the developments and changes in Linux and related products.  Linux.com offers free Linux tutorials, news and blogs, discussion forums and groups, a Linux software and hardware directory, and a job board.

History 
Originally, the site was owned by Andover.net, which was taken over by VA Linux Systems (which later changed into VA Software, and then SourceForge, Inc., now Geeknet). It was dedicated to providing news and services to the free and open source software community. The site reported 25 million hits in the first month of operation.

Linux.com suspended the publication of new articles in December 2008, but implied in an announcement on New Year's Day 2009 that publication would shortly resume after unspecified changes to the site; legal considerations were given as the reason why the anticipated changes were not clearly described.

On March 3, 2009, the Linux Foundation announced that they would be taking over management of Linux.com.

In April, 2019, the Linux Foundation laid off all authors and editors at the Linux.com site.

Notes

References

External links

Bruce Byfield, Looking back at Linux.com, March 4, 2009

Linux Foundation
Linux websites
Linux magazines
Geeknet